Kodra is an urban-type settlement in Bucha Raion (district) of Kyiv Oblast (province) in northern Ukraine. It belongs to Makariv settlement hromada, one of the hromadas of Ukraine. The population was 1,756 at the 2001 Ukrainian census. Current population: .

Kodra was founded in 1600 as a village, and it retained its village status until it was upgraded to that of an urban-type settlement in 1938.

Until 18 July 2020, Kodra belonged to Makariv Raion. The raion was abolished that day as part of the administrative reform of Ukraine, which reduced the number of raions of Kyiv Oblast to seven. The area of Makariv Raion was split between Bucha and Fastiv Raions, with Kodra being transferred to Bucha Raion.

References

External links
 

Urban-type settlements in Bucha Raion
Populated places established in 1600
Bucha Raion